aTunes is a free and open source audio player with MPlayer as its playback engine. aTunes supports MP3, Ogg Vorbis, FLAC and other formats. aTunes allows users to edit tags, organize music and rip audio CDs easily.

Features

Media Library
According to its wiki, aTunes is able to support large playlists with thousands of songs. A filtering option allows looking for particular artists, albums or genres. Drag-and-Drop feature is available to drag songs the navigator or the computer file system. "Smart" playlists are supported.

The library is organized by multiple columns such as title, artist, album and genre which can be sorted or hidden. The navigator could be displayed as a hierarchy tree, folders, or covers.

Supported formats
aTunes can read the following formats: MP3, Ogg and Vorbis, WMA, WAV, FLAC, MP4, APE, MPC, cue files, mac. Online radio is also supported. Furthermore, M3U playlists can be opened and saved.

Tagging
aTunes uses a tag editor window to edit MP3, OGG, FLAC, WMA, MP4, ra, rm tags. It is able to show pictures included in ID3v2 tags.

Statistics
Users are able to view various statistics about their music playing habits such as songs most played and songs never played. These data are displayed as graphs and pie charts.

Audio CDs
Music can be ripped from Audio CDs and encoded into WAV, MP3, FLAC and OGG formats. The Nero AAC Codec is optionally supported. aTunes has the feature to automatically retrieve track names from Amazon.

Internet
aTunes has a tool to look up artists on different websites such as YouTube, Google Video and Wikipedia. It also integrates with Last.fm and AudioScrobbler.

Interface Views
In addition to the standard view with all controls, and features, there is a multi-window view allowing each element (navigator, playlist, context information) to be shown in a separate window which can be located and arranged individually. A full-screen mode is available and the player could also be sent to the notification area. aTunes colors can be changed by switching themes.

Software Translations
aTunes is available in Arabic, Simplified Chinese, Traditional Chinese, Czech, Dutch, English, French, Galician, German, Greek, Hungarian, Italian, Japanese, Norwegian, Polish, Portuguese, Brazilian Portuguese, Russian, Slovak, Spanish, Swedish, Turkish and Ukrainian.

 Tags
Auto tag edition tools: set track number automatically, set genre automatically.
Some auto tag tools for all repository.
 Device view
Connect your portable player or anything that could be mounted as a file system, and view in aTunes, copy to repository, synchronize, etc. It can’t synchronize with iPods.
 Favorites
Songs, albums or artists can be selected as favorites.
Favorite elements are shown in the “Favorites” tab in Navigator.
 Podcasts
Subscribe to your favorite podcasts and listen in aTunes.

See also

Software audio players (free and open-source)

References

External links

Home Page - atunes.org

Free audio software
Free software programmed in Java (programming language)
Free media players
Tag editors
Jukebox-style media players
Windows media players
Linux media players
Audio player software for Linux